The Military ranks of the People's Socialist Republic of Albania were the military insignia used by the Albanian People's Army. After the Second World War, the Military ranks of the Albanian Kingdom were abandoned and replaced with insignia and ranks inspired by the Soviet military ranks. Albania used these ranks until May 1966, when military ranks were abolished altogether following Chinese example and based on doctrines of guerilla warfare.

Commissioned officer ranks 
The rank insignia of commissioned officers.

Other ranks 
The rank insignia of non-commissioned officers and enlisted personnel.

See also
 Military ranks of the Albanian Kingdom
 Military ranks of Albania

References 
Citations

Bibliography

External links 
 

Albania, People's Socialist Republic
Military of Albania